Svenska Cupen 2003 was the forty-eighth season of the main Swedish football Cup. The competition started on 27 March 2003 and concluded on 1 November 2003 with the Final, held at Råsunda Stadium, Solna Municipality in Stockholms län. IF Elfsborg won the final 2-0 against Assyriska Föreningen.

First round
There were 34 matches played between 27 March and 18 April 2003. There were 68 teams in the first round from Division 1, Division 2 and Division 3, but also including a few teams from Division 4 and Division 5.

!colspan="3"|27 March 2003

|-
!colspan="3"|30 March 2003

|-
!colspan="3"|1 April 2003

|-
!colspan="3"|6 April 2003

|-
!colspan="3"|8 April 2003

|-
!colspan="3"|9 April 2003

|-
!colspan="3"|12 April 2003

|-
!colspan="3"|13 April 2003

|-
!colspan="3"|14 April 2003

|-
!colspan="3"|18 April 2003

|}

Second round
In this round the 34 winning teams from the previous round were joined by 30 teams from Allsvenskan and Superettan.  The 32 matches were played between 29 April and 7 May 2003.

!colspan="3"|29 April 2003

|-
!colspan="3"|30 April 2003

|-
!colspan="3"|1 May 2003

|-
!colspan="3"|2 May 2003

|-
!colspan="3"|7 May 2003

|}

Third round
The 16 matches in this round were played between 20 May and 5 June 2003.

!colspan="3"|20 May 2003

|-
!colspan="3"|23 May 2003

|-
!colspan="3"|28 May 2003

|-
!colspan="3"|29 May 2003

|-
!colspan="3"|4 June 2003

|-
!colspan="3"|5 June 2003

|}

Fourth round
The 8 matches in this round were played between 18 June and 7 August 2003.

!colspan="3"|18 June 2003

|-
!colspan="3"|25 June 2003

|-
!colspan="3"|26 June 2003

|-
!colspan="3"|9 July 2003

|-
!colspan="3"|7 August 2003

|}

Quarter-finals
The 4 matches in this round were played between 7 August and 2 October 2003.

!colspan="3"|7 August 2003

|-
!colspan="3"|28 August 2003

|-
!colspan="3"|2 October 2003

|}

Semi-finals
The semi-finals were played on 25 September and 16 October 2003.

!colspan="3"|25 September 2003

|-
!colspan="3"|16 October 2003

|}

Final
The final was played on 1 November 2003 at the Råsunda Stadium.

Footnotes

External links 
  Svenska Cupen 2003 - Svenskfotboll.se - Official Website
  Svenska Cupen 2003 – everysport.com
  Sweden Cup 2003 - rsssf.com

2003
Cupen
2003 domestic association football cups